Blackstock Boneyard is a 2021 American horror slasher film directed by Andre Alfa.

Overview
Based on an untold true story, Alfa's directorial debut dramatizes the story of brothers Thomas Griffin and Meeks Griffin, two prominent black farmers who were forced to sell their land and wrongly executed. One hundred years later, they return to avenge their deaths by killing the descendants of those responsible. It was released in the United States on June 8, 2021, by Uncork'd Entertainment. It received positive reviews from critics, who praised the performances, direction, and atmosphere.

Plot
The plot of Blackstock Boneyard has its roots in the 1913 conviction and eventual execution of Thomas and Meeks Griffin, two wealthy black farmers for the murder of a veteran of the Confederate army. A murder they didn't commit and were eventually exonerated of in 2009.

Director Andre Alfa and writer Stephen George's story picks up in 2013 as Judge Carroll Johnson ‘CJ’ Ramage, the grandson of the judge that sentenced the Griffins to die is about to close a lucrative deal on the land that once was their farm.

There's just one problem, his lawyer has found another heir to the property, Lyndsy and she'll have to be convinced to sell. But as she and her friends arrive in town an objection to the sale is being raised, from the grave. A story of racial injustice, truth exhumed and justice served with fitting ferocity.

Cast
 Laura Flannery as Samantha Ramage
 Ashley Whelan as Lyndsy
 Aspen Kennedy Wilson as Jesse Washington
 Sara Morgan as Chloe
 Creek Wilson as Sheriff Brice
 Dean Wil as Meeks Griffin (as Dean Wilson) 
 Aubree Storm as Sarah
 David Jite as Thomas Griffin
 Brittany Lucio as Anna Davis
 Terry Milam as Judge Carroll Johnson 'CJ' Ramage
 Richie Stephens as Deputy Jasper
 Jonathan Fuller as Roger Newbold
 Bryan McClure as Corey Ramage

References

External links

 Blackstock Boneyard at Reel Reviews

2021 films
2021 horror films
2021 directorial debut films
American horror films
Films about brothers
American films about revenge
2020s English-language films
2020s American films